Usermontu is an ancient Egyptian mummy exhibited at the Rosicrucian Egyptian Museum of San Jose, California.

The name Usermontu – which means, "Powerful is Montu" – almost certainly does not match the still-unknown name originally belonged to the mummified man. The mistake arose because long after death the mummy was placed in a coffin originally belonged to another man, a priest named Usermontu, and was still inside of it at the time of rediscovery.
The mummy is very well preserved, and is also known for having an ancient but sophisticated prosthetic pin in its left knee.

History
In 1971, the Rosicrucian Museum acquired two sealed ancient Egyptian coffins from Neiman-Marcus. Unbeknownst to all, one of the coffin still contained the mummy which was discovered soon after the purchase. On the basis of the embalming type originally provided to “Usermontu”, it is believed that he was an upper-class Egyptian male who likely lived during the New Kingdom of Egypt (between 16th–11th century BCE). For a reason that remains unknown to us, several centuries after death his corpse was put inside the coffin of the “real” Usermontu who lived during the 26th Dynasty. Some time around 400 BCE, as suggested by radiocarbon dating, the body underwent another wrapping with linen bandages which are still visible today.
There is no clue of where the coffin and the mummy originally came from.

Prosthetic pin

In August 1995, BYU professor C. Wilfred Griggs performed some X-ray scans on the Rosicrucian mummies and discovered the presence of a  iron-made orthopedic screw inside “Usermontu”'s left knee. Griggs initially believed that the pin was inserted in modern times in order to reattach the leg to the rest of the body, so he later obtained permission to unwrap the leg and directly examine the pin in order to solve the mystery. After the examination, Griggs realized that the pin could not be inserted in modern times, and must have been placed after the man's death but before his burial, a hypothesis confirmed by further analysis. The pin was held in place by an organic resin, analogous to modern bone cement. By doing so, those who performed the operation ensured the integrity of the body, required for the ancient Egyptian afterlife.

References

Ancient Egyptian priests
Ancient Egyptian mummies
2nd-millennium BC births
2nd-millennium BC deaths